Justice Riley may refer to:

Dorothy Comstock Riley (1924–2004), associate justice of the Michigan Supreme Court
Fletcher Riley (1893–1966), associate justice of the Oklahoma Supreme Court
James B. Riley (1894–1958), associate justice of the Supreme Court of Appeals of West Virginia